TH-dimer, also called tetrahydromethylcyclopentadiene dimer or RJ-4, is a liquid rocket propellant used in missiles and jet engines. For example, TH-dimer is used in the turbofan engine of the Tomahawk cruise missile.  It is also a component of the jet fuel JP-9.

The fuel is non-volatile, so it is safe to use on ships or submarines. It has a high flash point minimum of 60°C.  

Chemically, TH-dimer is a mixture of isomeric saturated hydrocarbons derived from hydrogenation of the dimer of methylcyclopentadiene.

References

Aviation fuels
Hydrocarbons
Tricyclic compounds